Jamnice may refer to the following places:

Jamnice, a village in the Opava District in the Czech Republic
Jamnice, a village within Kalisz County in Poland